"You're Such a Good Looking Woman" is a song by Irish singer Joe Dolan. The song was written by  Albert Hammond and Mike Hazlewood and produced by Geoffrey Everitt. It was released in 1970 becoming an international hit for Dolan, peaking at number 4 on the Irish Singles Chart. It also reached number 3 on Ultratop, number 20 on the Dutch Top 40 and number 17 on the UK Singles Chart.  The song featured in 2021 Disney film "Cruella".

The song has been covered many times including a version by David Ray & The Daylight Super Band.

Dolan revived the song in a novelty single with the character Dustin the Turkey. This version was retitled "Good Looking Woman" and credited to Dustin & Joe Dolan.

Charts

References

Joe Dolan songs
Songs written by Albert Hammond
Songs written by Mike Hazlewood